Qaiser Ashraf (born 8 May 1994) is a Pakistani cricketer who plays for Lahore. He was the leading wicket-taker for Lahore Whites in the 2018–19 Quaid-e-Azam One Day Cup, with sixteen dismissals in five matches. In March 2019, he was named in Baluchistan's squad for the 2019 Pakistan Cup.

References

External links
 

1994 births
Living people
Pakistani cricketers
Lahore Eagles cricketers
Lahore Whites cricketers
Nugegoda Sports and Welfare Club cricketers
Cricketers from Lahore